Lord of Connaught (Connacht) was a title used by several Norman barons in Ireland. Granted to William de Burgh, the lordship was claimed by his son, Richard Mor de Burgh, and his descendants.

Conquest
During the Norman invasion of Ireland, William de Burgh (d.1206) was apparently granted Connacht, but never took possession of it. It remained in the hands of native kings until 1224, when his son, Richard Mor de Burgh, claimed it on the basis of his father's grant. Richard's uncle Hubert de Burgh was then Justiciar of Ireland and upheld the claim in 1227. Richard called upon the feudal levies of Ireland and conquered Connacht (1235), assuming the title Lord of Connaught.

Richard's son Walter de Burgh, 1st Earl of Ulster, his son Richard Óg de Burgh, 2nd Earl of Ulster, and  Richard Óg's grandson William Donn de Burgh, 3rd Earl of Ulster all seem to have used the title but, on the death of the latter in 1333, civil war broke out over control of the de Burgh lands.

Division
Connacht was divided between Sir Ulick Burke (1st Mac William Uachtar (Upper Mac William) or Clanricarde, Galway) and Edmond Albanach de Burgh (1st Mac William Íochtar or Lower Mac William, Mayo) and the title fell out of use. It was not recognized in the Peerage of Ireland, and the heirs-general of William Donn, who retained the title Earl of Ulster, did not continue to use it.

Genealogy

Lords of Connaught
Richard Mór de Burgh, 1st Lord of Connaught
Walter de Burgh, 2nd Lord of Connaught (1st Earl of Ulster)
Richard Óg de Burgh, 3rd Lord of Connaught (2nd Earl of Ulster)
William Donn de Burgh, 4th Lord of Connaught (3rd Earl of Ulster)
Elizabeth de Burgh, 4th Countess of Ulster

See also
 House of Burgh, an Anglo-Norman and Hiberno-Norman dynasty founded in 1193

References

Lord of Connaught
Lord of Connaught
11th century in Ireland
12th century in Ireland
13th century in Ireland
Lordship of Ireland